Commander Mahesh Ramchandran (born 2 June 1967) is a retired Indian Naval Officer.  He is a graduate of the National Defence Academy, with a Bachelor of Science degree from Jawaharlal Nehru University.  Mahesh was awarded the Arjuna Award on 29 August 2002 for the year 2001. This was conferred to him by the then President A. P. J. Abdul Kalam.

Career and recognition 

He started his Naval Career with the Indian Naval Air Arm as a jet pilot. 
 
In 1994, he received a Commendation by the then Chief of Naval Staff  for the Sport of Sailing.  He began his sailing career in the Hyderabad Sailing Week.  In 1996, 1997, 1999, 2001 he was given the Yachtsman of the Year Award by the President, Yachting Association of India. He participated in the 2002 Asian Games and won a bronze medal for India in the Enterprise class of the boat along with the team of Aashim Mongia.  In the Asian Games 2006 in the Match Racing class he won a silver medal for India skippering the event with team of Sanjeev Chauhan, Girdhari Yadav and Nitin Mongia.  In the World Military Games in 2007, he won a Gold in Match Racing.  In the World Sailing Championships in 1999 held in South Africa, he won a silver medal for the country.  In the Asian Sailing Championships in 2001, 2006, 2010 and 2012 he won Gold, Silver and bronze medals for India. 
 
In 2009, he was selected by the Navy to conduct Sailing Trials of INSV Mhadei which has successfully completed two solo circumnavigation by Indians.  In 2010, he was the first Officer-in-Charge of the Watermanship Training Centre at the Indian Naval Academy Ezhimala.  At the Academy, he instituted the Admirals Cup Regatta, an Inter-Navy Sailing Championship.  He has also been the National Coach for the Olympic Laser Class Association of India, Matchracing Class and Enterprise Class.

References

External links 
 http://archive.indianexpress.com/news/mahesh-yadav-snatch-firstever-sailing-gold/230255/  Indian Express, Mumbai, 19 October, Fri 19 Oct 2007: World Military Games
 http://www.sailingtimesindia.com/2012/02/25/mahesh-wins-silver-in-asian-match-racing-championship/ Sailing Times: Asian Sailing Championship (Silver)
 http://bangaloremirror.indiatimes.com/columns/sunday-read//articleshow/22289121.cms? Bangalore Mirror
 http://www.thehindu.com/todays-paper/tp-sports/Mahesh-triumphs/article16028425.ece The Hindu, May01, 2010, Updated- 23 September 2010: UTV Match Racing Nationals
 http://www.business-standard.com/article/pti-stories/sailors-from-three-cities-to-take-part-in-yacht-race-114032700775_1.html Business Standard via- Press Trust of India, 27 March 2014 :13th Deloitte-JJ Memorial Cup yachting regatta
 http://www.rediff.com/sports/report/mumbai-welcomes-queens-baton-relay/20100910.htm Rediff, 10 September 2010: Mumbai welcoming Queen's Baton Relay
 http://www.afternoondc.in/sports/sports-in-brief/article_106264 The Afternoon DC, Friday, 28 March 2014: Deloitte JJ Memorial Cup 
 http://www.okdia.org/results/w03.php OKDIA: World Championship 2003
 http://www.sailing.org/news/10968.php#.WSPRWGiGOUk sailing.org
 2004 Star World Championships
 http://www.mid-day.com/articles/mumbai-goa-sailboat-rally-november-mumbai-guide-konkan-coastline/17702173
 http://timesofindia.indiatimes.com/sports/more-sports/others/Mahesh-wins-national-sailing-title/articleshow/19666106.cms

Asian Games medalists in sailing
Sailors at the 2006 Asian Games
Asian Games bronze medalists for India
Indian male sailors (sport)
Sailors at the 2002 Asian Games
Asian Games silver medalists for India
Living people
Recipients of the Arjuna Award
Medalists at the 2002 Asian Games
Medalists at the 2006 Asian Games
1967 births